The Sanya Ladies Open was a golf tournament co-sanctioned by the China LPGA Tour, Ladies Asian Golf Tour and the Ladies European Tour from 2010 to 2017. It was played at the Yalong Bay Golf Club in Sanya, China.

Winners

External links
Coverage on the Ladies European Tour's official site

Former Ladies European Tour events
Golf tournaments in China
Sport in Hainan
Recurring sporting events established in 2010
Recurring sporting events disestablished in 2017